The Lola B01/00 is an open-wheel racing car chassis, designed and built by Lola Cars that competed in the CART open-wheel racing series, for competition in the 2001 season. It scored a total of 10 race wins that season, with Swede Kenny Bräck eventually finishing in second place, as runner-up in the championship, with 163 points in this car.

References 

Lola racing cars
Open wheel racing cars
American Championship racing cars